New Mexico State Road 3 (NM 3) is a north-south state highway in the state of New Mexico. NM 3's southern terminus is at U.S. Route 54 (US 54) in the small town of Duran, and the northern terminus is at Frontage Road 2116 (FR 2116) north of Ribera.

Route description

NM 3 begins at its intersection with US 54 in the unincorporated community of Duran. The road travels first in a northwest and then a primarily northern direction for about  until its junction with US 285 and US 60 in Encino. The road then continues north for  through largely uninhabited areas to its junction with Interstate 40 (I-40). It then continues in a generally northern direction past exit 323 on I-25 to its northern terminus at FR 2116 north of Ribera. This segment passes through Villanueva State Park, where the road briefly follows the Pecos River.

History

Major intersections

See also

 List of state roads in New Mexico

References

External links

003
Transportation in San Miguel County, New Mexico
Transportation in Torrance County, New Mexico